Cécile Morrisson (born 16 June 1940) is a French historian and numismatist. She is Director of Research emeritus at the French National Center for Scientific Research and specializes in the study of the Byzantine Empire.

Biography 
Cécile Morrisson was born on 16 June 1940 in Dinan, France. She studied at the École normale supérieure, earned her Agrégation in history and obtained her doctorate in history at École normale supérieure (Paris) (ENS-Ulm).

She was director of the department of coins, medals and antiquities of the Bibliothèque nationale de France. She is Emeritus Research Director at the CNRS and Advisor for Byzantine Numismatics at Dumbarton Oaks, Washington, D.C.

Distinctions 
 Knight of the Legion of Honour 
 Knight of the National Order of Merit
 Knight of the Academic Palms

Morrisson is a member of the Académie des Inscriptions et Belles-Lettres since December 11, 2015. She was awarded the Medal of the Royal Numismatic Society in 1994, and the British Academy's Derek Allen Prize for numismatics in 1999.

Publications 
 Cécile Morrison, Les Croisades, Paris : PUF, 1969
 Cécile Morrison, Catalogue des monnaies byzantines de la Bibliothèque nationale, Paris, 1970
 book 1 : D'Anastase Ier à Justinien II (491-711)
 book 2 : De Philippicus à Alexis III (711-1204)
 Cécile Morrison and Tommaso Bertelè, Numismatique byzantine suivie de deux éludes inédites sur les monnaies des Paléoloques, Wetteren, 1978
 Roger Guéry, Cécile Morrisson and Hédi Slim, Recherches archéologiques franco-tunisiennes à Rougga, Rome, 1982
 book 3 : Le trésor de monnaies d'or byzantines
 Cécile Morrisson, Claude Brenot, Jean-Noël Barrandon, Jean-Pierre Callu, J. Poirier and Robert J. Halleux, L'Or monnayé, book 1 : Purification et altérations de Rome à Byzance, Paris, 1985
 Catherine Abadie-Reynal, Vassiliki Kravari, Jacques Lefort and Cécile Morrisson, Hommes et richesses dans l'Empire byzantin, vol. 1-2, Paris, 1989-1991
 Jean-Claude Cheynet, Cécile Morrisson and Werner Seibt, Sceaux byzantins de la collection Henri Seyrig, Paris, 1991
 Cécile Morrisson, La numismatique, Paris, 1992
 Cécile Morrisson, Monnaie et finances à Byzance, Aldershot: Variorum, 1994. 
 Cécile Morrisson and Bernd Kluge, A Survey of Numismatic Research 1990-1995, Berlin, 1997
 Cécile Morrisson, Les Échanges au Moyen Âge: Justinien, Mahomet, Charlemagne; trois empires dans l'économie médiévale, Dijon, 2000
 Denis Feissel, Cécile Morrisson et Jean-Claude Cheynet, Trois donations byzantines au Cabinet des Médailles : Froehner (1925) ; Schlumberger (1929) ; Zacos (1998), Paris, 2001 (exposition organised on the occasion of the XXe Congrès International des Etudes Byzantines à Paris, 16 July - 14 October 2001)
 Cécile Morrisson, Le Monde byzantin, book 1 : L'Empire romain d'Orient: 330-641, Paris : PUF, 2004 
 Jacques Lefort, Cécile Morrisson and Jean-Pierre Sodini, Les Villages dans l'Empire byzantin, IVe-XVe siècle, Paris, 2005
 Cécile Morrisson, Vladislav Popovic and Vujadin Ivaniševic, Les Trésor monétaires byzantins des Balkans et d'Asie Mineure (491-713), Paris, 2006
 Angeliki E. Laiou and Cécile Morrisson, The Byzantine Economy, Cambridge, 2007. 
 Cécile Morrisson (and John William Nesbitt,Catalogue of Byzantine seals at Dumbarton Oaks and in the Fogg Museum of Art . 6: Emperors, patriarchs of Constantinople, addenda, Washington, DC, 2009
 Angeliki E. Laiou and Cécile Morrisson, Le monde byzantin. Byzance et ses voisins 1204 - 1453, book 3: L'empire grec et ses voisins, XIIIe - XVe siècle, Paris, 2011
 Cécile Morrisson, Trade and Markets in Byzantium, Washington, DC, 2012
 Cécile Morrisson, Byzance et sa monnaie (IVe - XVe siècle). Précis de numismatique byzantine, suivi du catalogue de la collection Lampart, Paris, 2015
 Cécile Morrisson and Georg-D. Schaaf, Byzance et sa monnaie: IVe-XVe siècle: précis de numismatique byzantine'', Paris, 2015

References

1940 births
French Byzantinists
French numismatists
Scholars of Byzantine numismatics
Research directors of the French National Centre for Scientific Research
Members of the Académie des Inscriptions et Belles-Lettres
Corresponding Members of the Academy of Athens (modern)
Corresponding Members of the Austrian Academy of Sciences
Corresponding Fellows of the Medieval Academy of America
École Normale Supérieure alumni
Academic staff of the École pratique des hautes études
Harvard University faculty
Chevaliers of the Légion d'honneur
Knights of the Ordre national du Mérite
Chevaliers of the Ordre des Palmes Académiques
People from Dinan
Living people
20th-century French historians
21st-century French historians
20th-century French women writers
21st-century French women writers
French women historians
Women numismatists